Udaykant Madhavji Merchant (14 August 1916 – 7 February 1985) was an Indian first class cricketer.

The brother of Test player Vijay Merchant, Uday was a right-handed batsman and played in the Ranji Trophy for Bombay. He played a total of 22 first class matches for Bombay, scoring 1758 runs at 67.61.

Merchant's highest score of 217 was made against Hyderabad in the 1947–48 Ranji Trophy semi-final.

References

1916 births
1985 deaths
Indian cricketers
Mumbai cricketers
Hindus cricketers
West Zone cricketers